Amgalanta is a rural locality (an ulus) in Khorinsky District, Republic of Buryatia, Russia. The population was 218 as of 2010. There are 5 streets.

Geography 
Amgalanta is located 54 km northeast of Khorinsk (the district's administrative centre) by road. Georgiyevskoye is the nearest rural locality.

References 

Rural localities in Khorinsky District